Pascal Schmidt (born 2 May 1993) is a German former professional footballer who played as a defender.

References

External links
 
 

1993 births
Living people
German footballers
Association football midfielders
Stuttgarter Kickers II players
Stuttgarter Kickers players
3. Liga players
German expatriate footballers
German expatriate sportspeople in the United States
Expatriate soccer players in the United States
Footballers from Stuttgart